Johan Peter Jacobson (27 February 1857 – ??) was a Norwegian politician for the Liberal Party.

He was elected to the Norwegian Parliament in 1900, representing the constituency of Nedenes Amt. He worked as a smith there. He served only one term.

References

1857 births
Year of death missing
Members of the Storting
Liberal Party (Norway) politicians
Aust-Agder politicians